Erck Rickmers (born 29 April 1964 in Bremerhaven) is a German businessman and politician of the SPD (Social Democratic Party). He was an MP from 2011 to 2012.

Early life and education
Erck Rickmers was born and grew up in Bremerhaven. He comes from the Rickmers family of entrepreneurs in Bremerhaven, whose founder, Rickmer Clasen Rickmers, founded the Rickmers shipyard in Bremerhaven in 1834. He did his schooling at the Stiftung Louisenlund in Schleswig-Holstein. After receiving his Abitur certificate and completing his military service with the German Air Force, he qualified as a shipping merchant following an apprenticeship with the Hamburg shipping company Ernst Russ. Among other positions, Rickmers subsequently worked as a ship broker at Harper Petersen & Co. in London. Rickmers attended a graduate program at the University of California, Santa Barbara, completing an M.A. degree in Religious Studies from 2015 to 2017.

Politics
Rickmers is a member of the Social Democratic Party of Germany (SPD). At the 2011 Hamburg state election, he became a member of the Hamburg Parliament. As a member of the Hamburg Parliament, Rickmers chaired the committee on economics, innovation, and media and was a member of both the budget committee and the committee on public enterprises. In 2013, he reportedly left politics.

Business career
In 1992 Rickmers co-founded the Hamburg-based investment company Nordcapital and became its sole shareholder in 1996. In 1998 he established the shipping company E.R. Schiffahrt. In 2008 Rickmers merged his assets under the umbrella of E.R. Capital Holding. Rickmers was selected as a chairman of the group in 2010.

Personal life
Rickmers is based in Hamburg, Germany. He is married to Cristina Sartori; they have five daughters.

Philanthropy
In 2016 Rickmers established the International Foundation for the Humanities and Social Change. The foundation supports research centers at the University of California, Santa Barbara, and at the Ca' Foscari University of Venice, as well as the University of Cambridge and the Humboldt University of Berlin.

Publications
 Erik Lindner: 175 Jahre Rickmers. Hoffmann und Campe 2009, S. 241–280.

See also
Hamburg Parliament
Johannes Versmann

References

1964 births
Living people
Social Democratic Party of Germany politicians
Members of the Hamburg Parliament